Jonny Moseley Mad Trix is a skiing video game published and developed by The 3DO Company. The game is based on the skier of the same name.

Soundtrack
The soundtrack was distributed by Palm Pictures.

Reception

Jonny Moseley Mad Trix received mixed reviews from critics. IGN rated the game a 3 out of 10, praising the soundtrack, graphics and presentation while criticizing the stale gameplay. GameZone rated the game 9 out of 10. On GameRankings the game holds a 47% rating for the PlayStation 2 version and a 44% rating for the Game Boy Advance version respectively.

References

External links

2001 video games
PlayStation 2 games
PlayStation 2-only games
Snowboarding video games
Video games based on real people
Video games developed in the United States